Giovanni Battista Bussi de Pretis (Urbino, 11 September 1721 – Jesi, 27 June 1800) was an Italian cleric promoted by Pope Pius VI to the rank of cardinal in the consistory of 21 February 1794.
He replaced Buenaventura Fernández de Córdoba Spínola as Cardinal-Priest of San Lorenzo in Panisperna.

References

1721 births
1800 deaths
18th-century Italian cardinals
Cardinals created by Pope Pius VI
People from Urbino